Ehan Bhat (born 11 February 1992 in Srinagar) is an Indian actor, best known for his leading role in the film 99 Songs (2019), for which he won the Filmfare Award for Best Male Debut at the 67th Filmfare Awards. He is also known for his role in the film Broken But Beautiful (2018).

References 

1992 births
Living people
Indian actors
Indian film actors